Nicagus is a genus of stag beetles in the family Lucanidae. There are at least three described species in Nicagus.

Species
These three species belong to the genus Nicagus:
 Nicagus japonicus Nagel, 1928
 Nicagus obscurus (LeConte, 1847)
 Nicagus occultus Paulsen & Smith, 2005

References

Further reading

 
 
 

Lucanidae
Articles created by Qbugbot